Anatoliko ("eastern place") can refer to:
 Anatoliko, Eordaia
 Anatoliko, Kozani
 Anatoliko, Thessaloniki
 former name of Aitoliko